The Church of Saint John the Baptist, Saint John the Baptist('s) Church, or variants thereof, may refer to:

Armenia
 Saint John the Baptist Church, Abovyan
 Saint John the Baptist Church, Yerevan

Australia
 St John the Baptist Church, Reid, Canberra, Anglican
 St John the Baptist Anglican Church, Bulimba, Brisbane
 St John the Baptist Anglican Church, Richmond, North Queensland
 St John the Baptist Church (Toodyay), Roman Catholic
 St John the Baptist Church, Toodyay (1863–1963)

Belgium
 Church of St. John the Baptist, Molenbeek

Bosnia and Herzegovina
 Saint John the Baptist Church, Livno

Bulgaria
 Church of Saint John the Baptist, Nesebar

Burma/Myanmar
 St. John the Baptist Church, Yangon

Canada
 Saint-Jean-Baptiste Church (Montreal)
 Saint-Jean-Baptiste Church (Quebec City)

France
 Église Saint-Jean-Baptiste du Faubourg in Aix-en-Provence
 Église Saint-Jean-Baptiste de Bastia
 Église Saint-Jean-Baptiste, Buhl, Haut-Rhin), with the Buhl Altarpiece
 Église Saint-Jean-Baptiste de La Porta
 Église Saint-Jean-Baptiste (Virargues)

Georgia
 Church of St. John the Baptist in Petra, Lazica (archaeological site)

India 
 St. John the Baptist Church, Mumbai

Israel/Palestine
 Roman Catholic Church of Saint John the Baptist, Ein Karem, Jerusalem
 Greek Orthodox Church of Saint John the Baptist, Jerusalem
 Church of the Visitation (formerly: "Abbey Church of St John in the Woods")
 Saint John the Baptist Church, Acre

Malta
 Rotunda of Xewkija (Church of St John the Baptist)

New Zealand
 Church of St. John the Baptist (Parnell, Auckland)
 St. John the Baptist Church (Waimate North)

Norway
 Saint John the Baptist's Church, Sandefjord

Philippines
 San Juan Bautista Church (Calumpit), Bulacan
 Saint John the Baptist Parish Church (Calamba), Laguna
 Saint John the Baptist Parish Church (Liliw), Laguna
 Pinaglabanan Church (St. John the Baptist Parish), Pinaglabanan, San Juan City
 Tabaco Church (Saint John the Baptist Parish Church), Tabaco, Albay
 St John the Baptist Church (Taytay, Rizal)

Poland

Romania
 St. John the Baptist Church, Caransebeș
 Saint John the Baptist Church, Iași
 Saint John the Baptist Church, Târgu Mureș

Russia
 Church of St John the Baptist, Kerch
 St. John the Baptist Church, Saint Petersburg
 St. John the Baptist Church, Yaroslavl

Slovakia
 St John the Baptist's Church (Rimavská Sobota)

Sweden
 Saint John the Baptist's Church, Landskrona

Turkey
 Hirami Ahmet Pasha Mosque, formerly Church of Saint John the Baptist en to Trullo (Constantinople)
 Fenari Isa Mosque, formerly Church of Saint John the Baptist at Lips (Constantinople)

United Kingdom

England
Berkshire
 St John the Baptist Church, Windsor

Bristol
 Church of St John the Baptist, Bristol

Cambridgeshire
 St John the Baptist Church, Peterborough

Cheshire
 St John the Baptist's Church, Aldford
 St John the Baptist's Church, Bollington
 St John the Baptist's Church, Chester
 St John the Baptist's Church, Guilden Sutton
 St John the Baptist's Church, Hartford
 St John the Baptist's Church, Knutsford
 St John the Baptist's Church, Smallwood

Cornwall
 Church of St Morwenna and St John the Baptist, Morwenstow

Cumbria
 St John the Baptist's Church, Flookburgh

Derbyshire
 St John the Baptist's Church, Ault Hucknall

East Sussex
 St John the Baptist's Church, Brighton
 St John the Baptist's Church, Hove

Essex
 St. John the Baptist Church, Little Maplestead

 Gloucestershire
 Church of St. John the Baptist, Cirencester
 Church of St. John the Baptist, Harescrombe

 Greater Manchester
 St John the Baptist Church, Rochdale
 St John the Baptist's Church, Smallbridge

 Hampshire
 St. John the Baptist Church, Winchester

 Hertfordshire
Church of St John the Baptist, Royston, Hertfordshire

Isle of Wight
 Church of St John the Baptist, Newport
 Church of St John the Baptist, Niton
 Church of St John the Baptist, Northwood
 St John the Baptist Church, Yaverland

Lancashire
 St John the Baptist's Church, Arkholme
 St John the Baptist's Church, Broughton
 St John the Baptist Church, Burscough
 St John the Baptist Church, Porthcawl

Leicestershire
 Church of St John the Baptist, Billesdon
 Church of St John the Baptist, Belton

London
 St John the Baptist Church, Chipping Barnet
 St John the Baptist Church, Croydon, now officially Croydon Minster
 St John the Baptist Church, Pinner
 St John the Baptist, Holland Road, Kensington, a Grade I listed building by James Brooks

Merseyside
 St John the Baptist's Church, Earlestown
 Church of Saint John the Baptist, Liverpool

Norfolk
 Saint John the Baptist, Maddermarket, Norwich

Nottinghamshire
 Church of St John the Baptist, East Markham
 Church of St John the Baptist, Stanford on Soar

North Yorkshire
 St John the Baptist Church, Kirk Hammerton
 St John the Baptist's Church, Stanwick

Oxfordshire
 Church of St John the Baptist, Burford

Shropshire
 St John the Baptist's Church, Hope Bagot

Somerset
 Church of St John the Baptist, Frome
 Church of St John the Baptist, Midsomer Norton
 Church of Saint John the Baptist, South Brewham

South Yorkshire
 Saint John the Baptist Church, Penistone
 Church of St John the Baptist, Royston, South Yorkshire

Staffordshire
 St John the Baptist's Church, Burslem
 St John the Baptist's Church, Mayfield

Wiltshire
 St John the Baptist's Church, Allington

West Sussex
 St John the Baptist's Church, Clayton
 St John the Baptist's Church, Crawley

West Yorkshire
 St John the Baptist Church, Adel
 St John the Baptist's Church, Halifax, now officially Halifax Minster
 St John the Baptist's Church, Tunstall

Worcestershire
 St John the Baptist Church, Bromsgrove

Wales
 St John the Baptist Church, Cardiff

United States

Alaska
 St. John the Baptist Church (Angoon, Alaska)
 St. John the Baptist Chapel, in Naknek

Arkansas
 St. John the Baptist Catholic Church (Brinkley, Arkansas)

California
 St. John the Baptist Church (Capitola, California)

Delaware
 St. John the Baptist Roman Catholic Church (Newark, Delaware)

Hawaii
 Saint John the Baptist Catholic Church (Honolulu, Hawaii)

Iowa
 Church of St. John the Baptist (Burlington, Iowa)
 Saint John the Baptist Catholic Church (Peosta, Iowa)

Kansas
 St. John the Baptist Catholic Church (Beloit, Kansas)

Kentucky
 St. John the Baptist Roman Catholic Church (Wilder, Kentucky)

Louisiana
 St. John the Baptist Catholic Church, in Cloutierville, Louisiana
 St. John the Baptist Church (Dorseyville, Louisiana), listed on the NRHP in Louisiana

Massachusetts
 St. John the Baptist Church (New Bedford, Massachusetts)

Michigan
 St. John the Baptist Catholic Church (Hubbardston, Michigan)
 St. John the Baptist Catholic Church (Menominee, Michigan)

New Hampshire
 St. John the Baptist Church (Wakefield, New Hampshire)

New York
 St. John the Baptist Church (Manhattan)
 St. John the Baptist Roman Catholic Church (Plattsburgh, New York)

Ohio
 St. John's Catholic Church (Canton, Ohio)
 St. John the Baptist Catholic Church (Maria Stein, Ohio)

Pennsylvania
 St. John the Baptist Church (Pottsville, Pennsylvania)
 St. John the Baptist Church (Pittsburgh, Pennsylvania)
 St. John the Baptist Church, opened in 1892, closed in 2008; see Saint John the Baptist Elementary School, Pittston

Rhode Island
 St. John the Baptist Church (Pawtucket, Rhode Island)

South Dakota
 Lakeport Church (Yankton County, South Dakota)

Texas
 St. John the Baptist Catholic Church (Ammannsville, Texas)

Wisconsin
 St. John the Baptist Catholic Church (Johnsburg, Wisconsin)

See also
 St. John the Baptist Cathedral (disambiguation)
 St. John Baptist Church (disambiguation)–mainly concerning Baptist churches (as a denomination)